The seventh election to the Carmarthenshire County Council was held in March 1907. It was preceded by the 1904 election and followed by the 1910 election.

Overview of the result

The Conservatives made a conscious attempt to contest far more seats than at recent elections in an election dominated by ongoing disputes over diseatablishment. However, the Liberals retained a strong majority and many sitting members were returned unopposed.

Boundary changes

There were minor boundary changes leading to the creation of two additional wards, namely Ammanford and Llandissilio. The new Ammanford ward, which comprised the urban district of Ammanford was created by the division of the Bettws Ward into two. Significant population growth had taken place in the eastern part of the county as a result of the growth of the anthracite coal trade but demands for further additional wards to be formed in the Llanelli district were rejected. The second new ward was at Llandissilio in the western part of the county, on the Pembrokeshire border. It was formed out of portions of the existing Whitland and Llanboidy wards. There was less unanimity in favour of the new Llandissilio ward than was the case at Ammanford, and there were suggestions that an additional rural ward was being created to counterbalance the new industrial ward at Ammanford. A proposal for a third new ward, at Newchurch on the outskirts of Carmarthen was rejected in due course.

As a result of these boundary changes, the Council included 53 elected members as opposed to 51 previously. The number of aldermen remained at 17.

Retiring aldermen

The aldermen who retired at the election were

John Bevan, 
Joseph Joseph, 
Sir Lewis Morris, 
Daniel Stephens, 
H J Thomas, 
Thomas Watkins, 
Joseph Mayberry, 
Augustus Brigstocke,

Candidates

Eighteen wards were contested, compared with only six in 1904.

Four of those elected at the first election in 1889, and who had served continuosly since then, sought re-election. Earl Cawdor, Sir James Drummond, C.E. Morris and D,C. Parry (Llanelli) were all returned unopposed.

Outcome

While a small number of wards were hotly contested and the Conservatives made a small number of gains, their attempt to change the political composition of the council was unsuccessful.

In Llanarthney, a determined attempt was made to unseat Henry Jones-Davies, with allegations that the Conservative David Farr Davies, a colliery manager, was supported by some labour figures.

Ward results

Abergwili

Ammanford
New ward. Boundary change.

Bettws
Boundary change

Caio

Carmarthen Eastern Ward (Lower Division)
Brigstocke contested previous elections as a Conservative.

Carmarthen Eastern Ward (Upper Division)

Carmarthen Western Ward (Lower Division)

Carmarthen Western Ward (Upper Division)

Cenarth

Cilycwm

Conwil

Kidwelly

Laugharne

Llanarthney

Llanboidy

Llandebie

Llandilo Rural

Llandilo Urban
Gwynne Hughes had now returned to the Liberal fold.

Llandovery

Llandyssilio
Boundary Change

Llanedy

Llanegwad

Llanelly Division.1
Griffiths described himself as an Unionist in 1904

Llanelly Division 2

Llanelly Division 3

Llanelly Division 4

Llanelly Division 5

Llanelly Division 6

Llanelly Division 7

Llanelly Division 8

Llanelly Rural, Berwick

Llanelly Rural, Hengoed

Llanelly Rural, Westfa and Glyn

Llanfihangel Aberbythick

Llanfihangel-ar-Arth
The sitting member was elected on the casting vote of the returning officer.

Llangadock

Llangeler

Llangendeirne

Llangennech

Llangunnor

Llanon

Llansawel

Llanstephan

Llanybyther
Williams had been elected as a Conservative in 1904.

Mothvey

Pembrey North

Pembrey South

Quarter Bach

Rhydcymmerai

St Clears

St Ishmael

Trelech

Whitland

Election of aldermen

In addition to the 51 councillors the council consisted of 17 county aldermen. Aldermen were elected by the council, and served a six-year term. Following the elections the following eight aldermen were elected (with the number of votes in each case).

References

1907
1907 Welsh local elections